Incisive may refer to:

Medical uses 
 Incisor teeth,  front teeth present in most heterodont mammals.
 Incisive bone, the portion of maxilla adjacent to the incisors.
 Incisive foramen or anterior palatine foramen, a funnel-shaped opening in the bone of hard palate immediately behind incisor teeth.
 Incisive canals or foramina of Stensen.
 Incisive papilla, projection on the palate near the incisors.

Others 
 Incisive Media, a publisher of business media, based in London, United Kingdom.
 NCSim, a suite of tools from Cadence Design Systems related to the design and verification of ASICs, SoCs, and FPGAs.